Grebo IK is a Swedish football club located outside Åtvidaberg.

Background
Grebo IK currently plays in Division 4 Östergötland Västra which is the sixth tier of Swedish football. They play their home matches at the Grebovallen in Linköping.

Grebo IK are affiliated to Östergötlands Fotbollförbund.

Hall Of Fame
Hakan Johansson
Hakan Arpfors
Per Kjellberg
Robert Stein
Kent Skarphagen
Pierre Johansson

Season to season

Footnotes

External links
 Grebo IK – Official club website
 Grebo IK on Facebook

Sport in Östergötland County
Football clubs in Östergötland County
Association football clubs established in 1932
1932 establishments in Sweden